Luetkenotyphlus insulanus, the insular caecilian, is a species of caecilian in the family Siphonopidae. It is endemic to the Ilhabela archipelago in Brazil. Its natural habitat is subtropical forest where it lives in the soil.

References

Siphonopidae
Endemic fauna of Brazil
Amphibians of Brazil
Taxa named by Rodolpho von Ihering
Amphibians described in 1911
Taxonomy articles created by Polbot